Flag debate or Great flag debate may refer to:

 Australian flag debate, a debate over whether the Australian flag should be changed in order to remove the Union Flag from the canton.
 Great Canadian Flag Debate, which took place in 1964 when a new design for the national flag of Canada was chosen.
 New Zealand flag debate, a debate over whether the New Zealand flag should be changed in order to remove the Union Flag from the canton.

See also
 Confederate flag controversy
 Northern Ireland flags issue
 US Flag Desecration Amendment